World Cafe may refer to:
 World Cafe (radio program), a syndicated music radio program in the United States
 World café (conversation), a structured conversational process for knowledge sharing
 World Café (album), a 2018 studio album by Ron Korb